Daniel Rovira (born 15 December 1996) is a Colombian footballer who plays as a defender for USL Championship club Pittsburgh Riverhounds SC.

College
Rovira played two years of college soccer at Dean College between 2015 and 2016, before transferring to the University of Vermont in 2017.

Professional
Rovira signed his first professional deal with USL Championship club Pittsburgh Riverhounds SC on 8 March 2019.

References

External links
 
 

1996 births
Living people
Colombian footballers
Association football defenders
Vermont Catamounts men's soccer players
Pittsburgh Riverhounds SC players
USL Championship players
Soccer players from Massachusetts
Footballers from Bogotá
Dean Bulldogs men's soccer players